Dendrobium sanguinolentum, the blood-stained dendrobium, is a species of flowering plant in the family Orchidaceae. It is native to Southeast Asia (Thailand, Malaysia, Philippines, Borneo, Java, and Sumatra).

References

External links
IOSPE orchid photos, Dendrobium sanguinolentum Lindl. 1842 J.J.Sm Photo by © Lourens Grobler
Swiss Orchid Foundation at Herbarium Jany Renz, Dendrobium sanguinolentum 

sanguinolentum
Flora of Malesia
Orchids of Thailand
Plants described in 1842